The Prussian Union may refer to:

 The Prussian Confederation, a league of cities formed in 1440 to resist taxes levied by the Teutonic Order
 The Prussian Union of churches, a merger of Prussia's Lutheran and Reformed churches announced in 1817